Lacs de Maclu (or Lacs de Maclus) are two lakes at Le Frasnois in the Jura department of France.

The Grand Lac Maclu has a surface area of 21 ha and a length of 1.1 km with a maximum width of 300 m. Its maximum depth is 24 m. The lake is located in the municipalities of Le Frasnois and La Chaux-du-Dombief.

Petit Lac Maclu is located northeast of the former and has a surface area of 5 ha with a length of 500 m and a maximum width of 120 m. Its maximum depth is 11 m. The lake is located in with the municipality of Le Frasnois.

Maclu

References